The Congress for Jewish Culture (also known as the World Congress for Jewish Culture or, in Yiddish, der Alveltlekher Yidisher Kultur-kongres) is a secular organization founded in 1948  to promote Yiddish culture throughout the world.  Individuals active in the founding of the organization included Yiddish writers and intellectuals such as Shmuel Niger, Chaim Grade, Avrom Reyzen, Shmerke Kaczerginski, and Pinkhos Schwartz. At its founding, the society had offices in New York City, Buenos Aires and Paris.  Today, only the New York office remains active.

Since 1953 the Congress has published Die Zukunft (The Future, founded in 1892), the world's oldest Yiddish journal still in publication.  It has also been an important publisher of Yiddish reference works and monographs, including the 8-volume "Biographical Dictionary of Modern Yiddish Literature" (co-edited by Shmuel Niger and  Jacob Shatzky) and a supplemental work, the "Biographical Dictionary of Yiddish Writers in the Soviet Union".

The Congress also conducts yearly memorials in New York City in memory of the Warsaw ghetto uprising of April 19, 1943  and in memory of the Soviet Yiddish writers murdered on August 12, 1952 (also known as the Night of the Murdered Poets).

References

External links
 Congress for Jewish Culture - official

Non-profit organizations based in New York City
Yiddish culture in the United States